The 2009 Little League World Series was the 63rd edition of the championship tournament for Little League baseball, held in South Williamsport, Pennsylvania, from August 21 through August 30, 2009. Eight teams from the United States and eight from the rest of the world competed in the tournament. In the championship game, the United States champions, from Chula Vista, California, defeated the international champions from Taoyuan County, Taiwan. This was the first tournament in which a team representing Chinese Taipei reached the championship game since 1996, and the first championship for a team from the state of California since 1993.

Activision released a video game in advance of the event, Little League World Series Baseball 2009.

Teams

Republic of Korea, commonly known as South Korea, due to complicated relations with People's Republic of Korea, is recognized by the name South Korea by majority of international organizations including Little League Baseball (LLB). For more information, please see Cross-Strait relations.

Results

Pool play

The top two teams in each pool moved on to their respective semifinals. The winners of each met on August 30 to play for the Little League World Championship. Teams marked in green qualified to the knockout stage, while the remaining teams were eliminated.

Ties were broken based on records in head-to-head competition among tied teams. In the event of a three-way tie for first place, the tie was broken by calculating the ratio of runs allowed to defensive innings played for all teams involved in the tie. The team with the lowest runs-per-defensive-inning ratio was ranked first and advanced. Second place was determined by the head-to-head result of the other two teams. If the three-way tie was for second place, the runs-per-defensive-inning ratio rule was used. The team with the lowest run ratio advanced; the other two teams were eliminated.

United States

All times US EDT.

International

All times US EDT.

Elimination round

The United States championship game on August 29 was originally scheduled for 3:00 pm US EDT. After a pair of lengthy rain delays in the international championship game, maintenance required to repair the field for the next game, and to make sure the field was dry enough to play on, it was rescheduled for later that night.

Champions path
The Park View Little League won 18 games and lost 2 games to reach the Little League World Series. Overall, their record was 23–3. Their three losses came against Sweetwater Valley LL, Torrance LL (both from California), and McAllister Park American LL (from Texas). Park View became the ninth team and most recent from San Diego County to qualify for the Little League World Series as the last one was Vista, California in 2005. They also were the third team from San Diego County in the past nine years to qualify for the Little League World Series. During the West Regional the team hit 34 home runs in total and was accused of cheating. A Little League Official looked into the allegations but found no evidence to back them up.

Legacy

The City of Chula Vista organized a celebration parade for the team with the team riding on a fire engine which led them to a rally at Southwestern College. They received a congratulations from Governor Arnold Schwarzenegger. The team also met President Barack Obama in Washington D.C. and gave him a team jersey, team plaque and the key to the City of Chula Vista. A book was written about the Chula Vista team called The Blue Bombers: The True Story of the 2009 Little League World Champions, written by San Diego County Residents. A memorial wall was proposed to commemorate the team in Chula Vista. The team also appeared on The Tonight Show hosted by Conan O'Brien. The team was honored at San Diego Padres and Chargers games.

References

External links
2009 official results via Wayback Machine

 
Little League World Series
Little League World Series
Little League World Series